The Yankee 26 is an American trailerable sailboat that was designed by Sparkman & Stephens as an International Offshore Rule Quarter Ton class racer-cruiser and first built in 1974. The boat is Sparkman & Stephens design #2065.1.

Production
The design was initially built by Yankee Yachts in Inglewood, California, United States, starting in 1974, by they left the sailboat business in 1975. The design was then built by the Heritage Yacht Company until 1982 and finally by Heritage Boatworks in Hood River, Oregon, until 1990.

Design
The Yankee 26 is a recreational keelboat, built predominantly of fiberglass, with wood trim. It has a masthead sloop rig; a raked stem; a raised counter, reverse transom; a skeg-mounted rudder controlled by a tiller and a fixed fin keel. It displaces  and carries  of ballast.

The design has sleeping accommodation for four people, with a double "V"-berth in the bow cabin, a "U"-shaped settee in the main cabin and an aft quarter berth on the port side. The galley is located on the port side just forward of the companionway ladder. The galley is equipped with a two-burner stove, an ice box and a sink. The enclosed head is located opposite the galley on the starboard side.

Operational history
The boat is supported by an active class club that organizes racing events, the Quarter Ton Class.

In a 2010 review Steve Henkel wrote, "the beamy S&S design is solid and commodious, with Space Index and headroom well above her comp[etitor]s. At the same time, PHRF at 234 is equal to or less than her comp[etitor]s, indicating a good turn of speed for this type of boat. No doubt her deep
(4' 6") fixed keel and her relatively tall rig both contribute to her good performance. Worst features: Some owners report problems with severe gelcoat crazing, requiring extensive (and expensive) repair work to correct."

See also
List of sailing boat types

References

Keelboats
1970s sailboat type designs
Sailing yachts
Trailer sailers
Sailboat type designs by Sparkman and Stephens
Sailboat types built by Heritage Boatworks
Sailboat types built by Heritage Yacht Company
Sailboat types built by Yankee Yachts